Artun Akçakın (born 6 May 1993) is a Turkish professional footballer who plays as a forward for Tarsus İdman Yurdu.

Career

International career
Akçakın represented Turkey at the 2013 FIFA U-20 World Cup.

References

External links
 
 
 
 
 

1993 births
People from Çankaya, Ankara
Living people
Turkish footballers
Turkey youth international footballers
Turkey under-21 international footballers
Association football forwards
Gençlerbirliği S.K. footballers
Hacettepe S.K. footballers
Fethiyespor footballers
Adana Demirspor footballers
Alanyaspor footballers
Ümraniyespor footballers
Şanlıurfaspor footballers
Manisa FK footballers
Tarsus Idman Yurdu footballers
Eyüpspor footballers
Süper Lig players
TFF First League players
TFF Second League players
TFF Third League players